Divna M. Vuksanović (17 March 1965) is a Serbian philosopher, writer, media theorist and the president of the Aesthetic Society of Serbia.

Biography
She graduated from the Department of Performing and Organizing Cultural and Artistic Activities of the Faculty of Dramatic Arts in 1988 and the Department of Philosophy, University of Belgrade in 1992. She holds a MA in theater studies (1993) and a Doctor of Philosophy of Science in the field of contemporary philosophy and aesthetics (1998).

Work
She has published four scientific studies: 
Baroque spirit in modern philosophy: Benjamin, Adorno, Bloch, 2001 
Aesthetica Minima, 2004 
Philosophy Media: Ontology, aesthetics, criticism (first edition - 2007 Second Edition - 
2008) Philosophy media 2 : Ontology, aesthetics, criticism (2011).

She edited the book: 
The media for the book - book for the media, 2008.
Three thematic collections of the Aesthetic Society of Serbia: 
The aesthetics and art criticism, 2004. 
What is aesthetics? (With Nebojša Grubor, 
2006) Art culture (with Nebojša Grubor, 2007)
Thematic Issue 
Culture: Cultural Identities cities, 2009. 
Culture rhythms and spectacle, 2010. 
The philosophy of the media, 2012. Reviews

Selected works
 Postmoderna i fenomen sinkretizacije žanrova u jugoslovenskom pozorištu do 1991. godine, magistarski rad iz teatrologije, 1993.
 Barokni  duh u savremenoj filozofiji: Benjamin, Adorno, Bloh, doktorska disertacija, Čigoja, Beograd. 2001. .
 Aesthetica Minima, Zograf, Niš. 2004. .
 Filozofija medija: ontologija, estetika, kritika, monografija, 1. tom, Čigoja, Beograd. 2007. .
 Filozofija medija: ontologija, estetika, kritika, 2. tom, Fakultet dramskih umetnosti, Institut za pozorište, film, radio i televiziju, Čigoja, Beograd. 2011.

References

External links
 Faculty of Dramatic Arts / Teachers
 Interview

1965 births
20th-century Serbian philosophers
21st-century Serbian philosophers
Serbian women philosophers
Academic staff of the University of Belgrade
Writers from Belgrade
Serbian women writers
Living people